Russell L. Carson (born 1943) is a Co-founder and General Partner at private equity firm Welsh, Carson, Anderson & Stowe.

Early life and career
Carson attended public high school in Toledo, Ohio. He then matriculated at Dartmouth College, graduating with an A.B. in economics in 1965.  After Dartmouth, Carson attended Columbia Business School and obtained an MBA in 1967.  From 1967 to 1978, he worked at the Citicorp Venture Capital subsidiary of Citicorp, serving as its Chairman and CEO from 1974 to 1978.  Carson left Citicorp to fund the private equity fund Welsh, Carson, Anderson & Stowe.

As of 2016-2017, he is listed as a trustee of the Metropolitan Museum of Art in New York City, due to his contribution to the reinstallation of the Tombs of Perneb and Raemkai and surrounding galleries  of the museum.

Personal life
Carson is married to his wife Judy and together they have two children.

References

Columbia Business School alumni
Dartmouth College alumni
Living people
1943 births
20th-century American businesspeople